Xun may refer to:

China
Note: in Wade–Giles, Xun is romanized Hsün
Xun (surname) (荀), Chinese surname
Xun (instrument), Chinese vessel flute made of clay or ceramic
Xun, Hequ County (巡镇), town in Hequ County, Shanxi, China
Xun County (浚县), Henan, China

Other
Xun language (disambiguation), name of several southern African Khoisan languages

See also
 ǃKung people, of southwestern Africa
 Xionites, also known as Hunni, once a people from Central Asia who spoke an Iranian language